Leptobrachella minima is a species of frog in the family Megophryidae. It occurs in northern Thailand, northern Laos, and northern–central Vietnam.

It is locally threatened by habitat loss caused by deforestation driven by agricultural expansion. It occurs in many protected areas.

Photos

References

minima
Frogs of Asia
Amphibians of Laos
Amphibians of Thailand
Amphibians of Vietnam
Amphibians described in 1962
Taxa named by Edward Harrison Taylor